Branko Lazarević (Serbian Cyrillic: Бранко Лазаревић; born 14 May 1984) is a Serbian former professional footballer who played as a defender.

Club career
Born in Gračanica, Bosnia and Herzegovina, Lazarević played in the youth teams of ŽAK Kikinda, OFK Kikinda, and Vojvodina. He made his senior debuts with Vojvodina in the 2002–03 season. In the 2006 winter transfer window, Lazarević switched to second-tier club ČSK Čelarevo.

In the summer of 2007, Lazarević signed with OFK Beograd. He spent three seasons at the club, before moving abroad to France and joining Ligue 1 side Caen, on a three-year deal.

International career
Lazarević represented Serbia and Montenegro at the 2004 Summer Olympics. He appeared in two games, as the team exited in the first round having finished last in Group C, behind Argentina, Australia, and Tunisia. At youth level, Lazarević was also capped for the U21s.

References

External links

 
 
 
 

Association football defenders
Expatriate footballers in France
First League of Serbia and Montenegro players
FK ČSK Čelarevo players
FK Vojvodina players
Footballers at the 2004 Summer Olympics
Ligue 1 players
OFK Beograd players
Olympic footballers of Serbia and Montenegro
People from Gračanica, Bosnia and Herzegovina
Serbia and Montenegro under-21 international footballers
Serbian expatriate footballers
Serbian expatriate sportspeople in France
Serbian First League players
Serbian footballers
Serbian SuperLiga players
Serbs of Bosnia and Herzegovina
Stade Malherbe Caen players
1984 births
Living people